"Jeepers Creepers" is a popular song and jazz standard. The music was written by Harry Warren and the lyrics by Johnny Mercer for the 1938 movie Going Places. It was premiered by Louis Armstrong and has been covered by many other musicians. The song was nominated for the Academy Award for Best Original Song in 1938 but lost to "Thanks for the Memory."  The song was included in the 1984 Smithsonian collection American Popular Song: Six Decades of Songwriters and Singers and in the 1998 album The Songs of Harry Warren.

Background
In 1930s Hollywood, black actors were not filmed singing to each other, so Armstrong sang it to a racehorse named Jeepers Creepers. The phrase "jeepers creepers," a minced oath for "Jesus Christ," predates both the song and film. Mercer said that the title came from a Henry Fonda line in an earlier movie. The lyrics include:
Jeepers Creepers, where'd ya get those peepers?
Jeepers Creepers, where'd ya get those eyes?

1939 recordings
There were three popular versions of the song released in 1939, by Louis Armstrong, Larry Clinton, and Al Donahue. It served as a contrafact for the Tadd Dameron composition "Flossie Lou."

Lyrics 
Now, I don't care what the weather man says

When the weatherman says it's raining

You'll never hear me complaining, I'm certain the sun will shine

I don't care how the weather vane points

When the weather vane points to gloomy

It's gotta be sunny to me, when your eyes look into mine

Jeepers Creepers, where'd ya get those peepers?

Jeepers Creepers, where'd ya get those eyes?

Gosh all git up, how'd they get so lit up?

Gosh all git up, how'd they get that size?

Golly gee! When you turn those heaters on, woe is me

Got to get my cheaters on, Jeepers Creepers

Where'd ya get those peepers? On, those weepers

How they hypnotize, where'd ya get those eyes?

Where'd ya get those eyes? Where'd ya get those eyes?

Controversy 
Siouxsie and the Banshees's 1988 single "Peek-a-Boo" caused a minor controversy shortly after its release, as the lines of the chorus ("Golly jeepers/Where'd you get those weepers?/Peepshow, creepshow/Where did you get those eyes?") were found to be too similar to the lyrics of "Jeepers Creepers." To remedy the situation and to avoid legal action, the band gave co-songwriting credit on "Peek-a-Boo" to Warren and Mercer.

References

1938 songs
Songs with music by Harry Warren
Louis Armstrong songs
Songs with lyrics by Johnny Mercer
Songs written for films
1930s jazz standards